Ed Bird – Estella Lakes Provincial Park is a provincial park in British Columbia, Canada.

History and conservation 
This park was traditionally used by First Nations people.

Before becoming a provincial park on April 11, 2001, it was a forest recreation site and was later made into a protected area.

Recreation
Hunting, fishing, and snowmobiling are allowed within the park grounds.

Location
Located 67 km south of Fort Ware, British Columbia on the Russel Forestry Service Road. The closest community is Mackenzie, British Columbia.

Size
The park is 55.87 square kilometres in size.

References

External links

Ed Bird – Estella Lakes Provincial Park

Peace River Regional District
Provincial parks of British Columbia
2001 establishments in British Columbia
Protected areas established in 2001